The Treaty of Peace between the United States of America and the Kingdom of Spain, commonly known as the Treaty of Paris of 1898, was signed by Spain and the United States on December 10, 1898, that ended the Spanish–American War. Under it, Spain relinquished all claim of sovereignty over and title to territories described there as the island of Porto Rico and other islands now under Spanish sovereignty in the West Indies, and the island of Guam in the Marianas or Ladrones, the archipelago known as the Philippine Islands, and comprehending the islands lying within the following line: (details elided), to the United States. The cession of the Philippines involved a compensation of $20 million from the United States to Spain.

The treaty came into effect on April 11, 1899, when the documents of ratification were exchanged. It was the first treaty negotiated between the two governments since the 1819 Adams–Onís Treaty.

The Treaty of Paris marked the end of the Spanish Empire, apart from some small holdings. It had a major cultural impact in Spain known as the "Generation of '98". It marked the beginning of the United States as a world power. In the U.S., many supporters of the war opposed the treaty, which became one of the major issues in the election of 1900 when it was opposed by Democrat William Jennings Bryan, who opposed imperialism. Republican President William McKinley supported the treaty and was easily reelected.

Background
The Spanish–American War began on April 25, 1898, due to a series of escalating disputes between the two nations, and ended on December 10, 1898, with the signing of the Treaty of Paris. It resulted in Spain's loss of its control over the remains of its overseas empire. After much of mainland Latin America had achieved independence, Cuba tried its hand at revolution in 1868–1878, and again in the 1890s, led by José Martí. Martí returned to Cuba and participated at first in the struggles against the Spanish government, but was killed on May 19, 1895. The Philippines at this time also became resistant to Spanish colonial rule. August 26, 1896, presented the first call to revolt, led by Andrés Bonifacio, succeeded by Emilio Aguinaldo y Famy, who had his predecessor arrested. Bonifacio was executed on May 10, 1897. Aguinaldo then negotiated the Pact of Biak-na-Bato with the Spaniards and was exiled to Hong Kong along with the other revolutionary leaders.

The Spanish–American War that followed had overwhelming public support in the United States due to the popular fervor towards supporting Cuban freedom as well as furthering U.S. economic interests overseas. The U.S. was particularly attracted to the developing sugar industry in Cuba. The U.S. military even falsified reports in the Philippines in order to maintain public support for involvement abroad. The U.S. appealed to the principles of Manifest Destiny and expansionism to justify its participation in the war, proclaiming that it was America's fate and its duty to take charge in these overseas nations.

On September 16, President William McKinley issued secret written instructions to his emissaries as the Spanish–American War drew to a close:

Negotiations
Article V of the peace protocol between United States and Spain on August 12, 1898 read as follows:

The composition of the American commission was somewhat unusual in that three of its members were senators, which meant, as many newspapers pointed out, that they would later vote on the ratification of their own negotiations. These were American delegation's members:
 William R. Day, chairman, a former U.S. Secretary of State who had resigned from the position to lead the commission
 William P. Frye, a senator from Maine
 Cushman Kellogg Davis, a senator from Minnesota
 George Gray, a senator from Delaware
 Whitelaw Reid, a former diplomat and a former nominee for Vice President

The Spanish commission included the following Spanish diplomats:
 Eugenio Montero Ríos,
 Buenaventura de Abarzuza,
 José de Garnica,
 Wenceslao Ramírez de Villa-Urrutia,
 Rafael Cerero, and
 Jules Cambon (French diplomat).

The American delegation, headed by former Secretary of State William R. Day, who had vacated his position as U.S. Secretary of State to head the commission, arrived in Paris on September 26, 1898. The negotiations were conducted in a suite of rooms at the Ministry of Foreign Affairs. At the first session, on October 1, the Spanish demanded that before the talks got underway, the return of the city of Manila, which had been captured by the Americans a few hours after the signing of the peace protocol in Washington, to Spanish authority. The Americans refused to consider the idea and, for the moment, it was pursued no further.

Felipe Agoncillo, a Filipino lawyer who represented the First Philippine Republic, was denied participation in the negotiation.

For almost a month, negotiations revolved around Cuba. The Teller Amendment to the declaration of war made it impractical for the United States to annex the island as it had with Puerto Rico, Guam, and the Philippines. At first, Spain refused to accept the Cuban national debt of four hundred million dollars, but ultimately, it had no choice. Eventually, it was agreed that Cuba was to be granted independence and for the Cuban debt to be assumed by Spain. It was also agreed that Spain would cede Guam and Puerto Rico to the United States.

The negotiators then turned to the question of the Philippines. Spanish negotiators were determined to hang onto all they could and hoped to cede only Mindanao and perhaps the Sulu Islands. On the American side, Chairman Day had once recommended the acquisition of only the naval base in Manila, as a "hitching post." Others had recommended retaining only the island of Luzon. However, in discussions with its advisers, the commission concluded that Spain, if it retained part of the Philippines, would be likely to sell it to another European power, which would likely be troublesome for America. On November 25, the American Commission cabled McKinley for explicit instructions. Their cable crossed one from McKinley saying that duty left him no choice but to demand the entire archipelago. The next morning, another cable from McKinley arrived:

On November 4, the Spanish delegation formally accepted the American demand, and Spanish Prime Minister Práxedes Mateo Sagasta backed the commission. With the growing risk of the negotiations collapsing, there were mutters about resuming the war. The U.S. elections on November 8, however, cut McKinley's Republican majority in Congress less than had been anticipated. The American delegation, therefore, took heart, and Frye unveiled a plan of offering Spain ten or twenty million dollars for the islands.

After some discussion, the American delegation offered twenty million dollars on November 21, one tenth of a valuation that had been estimated in internal discussions in October, and requested an answer within two days. Montero Ríos said angrily that he could reply at once, but the American delegation had already departed from the conference table. When the two sides met again, Queen-Regent Maria Christina had cabled her acceptance. Montero Ríos then recited his formal reply:

Work on the final draft of the treaty began on November 30. It was signed on December 10, 1898. The next step was ratification. In Madrid, the Cortes Generales, Spain's legislature, rejected it, but Maria Christina signed it as she was empowered to do by a clause in the Spanish constitution.

U.S. ratification

In the Senate, there were four main schools of thought on U.S. imperialism that influenced the debate on the treaty's ratification. Republicans generally supported the treaty, but those opposed either aimed to defeat the treaty or exclude the provision that stipulated the acquisition of the Philippines. Most Democrats favored expansion as well, particularly in the South. A minority of Democrats also favored the treaty on the basis of ending the war and granting independence to Cuba and the Philippines.
During the Senate debate on ratification, Senators George Frisbie Hoar and George Graham Vest were outspoken opponents. Hoar stated:

Some anti-expansionists stated that the treaty committed the United States to a course of empire and violated the most basic tenets of the constitution. They argued that neither the Congress nor the President had the right to pass laws that governed colonial peoples who were not represented by lawmakers.

Some Senate expansionists supported the treaty and reinforced such views by arguing:

Expansionists said that the Constitution applied only to citizens, an idea that was later supported by the Supreme Court in the Insular Cases.

As the Senate debate continued, Andrew Carnegie and former President Grover Cleveland petitioned the Senate to reject the treaty. Both men adamantly opposed such imperialist policies and participated in the American Anti-Imperialist League, along with other such prominent members as Mark Twain and Samuel Gompers.

Fighting erupted between Filipino and American forces in Manila on February 4, and quickly escalated into a battle between armies. This changed the course of debate in the Senate in favor of ratification. The treaty was eventually approved on February 6, 1899, by a vote of 57 to 27, just over the two-thirds majority required. Only two Republicans voted against ratification: George Frisbie Hoar of Massachusetts and Eugene Pryor Hale of Maine. Senator Nelson W. Aldrich had opposed entry into the Spanish–American War but supported McKinley after it began. He played a central role in winning the treaty's two-thirds majority ratification.

Provisions
The Treaty of Paris provided for the independence of Cuba from Spain, but the U.S. Congress ensured indirect U.S. control by the Platt Amendment and the Teller Amendment. Spain relinquished all claims of sovereignty over and title to Cuba. Upon Spain's departure, Cuba was to be occupied by the United States, which would assume and discharge any obligations of international law by its occupation.

The treaty also specified that Spain would cede Puerto Rico and the other islands under Spanish sovereignty in the West Indies as well as the island of Guam in the Mariana Islands to the United States.

The treaty also specified that Spain would cede the Philippine Islands, including the islands within a specified line, to the United States in exchange for twenty million dollars.

Specifics of the cession of the Philippines were later clarified on November 7, 1900, when Spain and the United States signed the Treaty of Washington. This clarified that the territories relinquished by Spain to the United States included any and all islands belonging to the Philippine Archipelago, but lying outside the lines described in the Treaty of Paris. That treaty explicitly named the islands of Cagayan Sulu and Sibutu and their dependencies as among the relinquished territories. The boundary between the Philippines and North Borneo was further clarified by the Convention Between the United States and Great Britain (1930).

Muslim sultanates issue

A major problem that ultimately led to the Moro Rebellion and the prolonging of the Philippine–American War long past 1902 (when the United States declared that the war against the Catholic Filipinos in northern Philippines was over) was that three sovereign independent states known as sultanates in present-day southern Philippines were also given to the United States even though Spain had no sovereignty over them. They were the Sultanate of Maguindanao, the Sultanate of Sulu, and the Confederation of sultanates in Lanao. The texts of the Spanish and English copies of the treaties and agreements with these Moro sultanates all claimed that sovereignty was handed over to the Spanish Empire and the United States, but the local language's copy of the texts always emphasized the sovereignty and independence of the sultanates and actually included provisions of tribute (similar to the British leasing of Hong Kong from the Qing Dynasty) to be paid to the rulers by the Spanish and the Americans for a handful of lightly garrisoned coastal outposts in the sultanates. Suzerainty, not sovereignty, was the relationship between Spain and these three sultanates, implying that the Spanish Empire did not have the right to include Mindanao and the Sulu Archipelago in the Treaty of Paris. The United States confirmed during the Kiram-Bates Treaty negotiations that Spain had never had sovereignty. The United States fought long brutal wars against the Moros in the sultanates from 1899 to 1913. It annexed the Sultanate of Maguindanao and the Confederation of sultanates in Lanao in 1905 after the Battle of the Malalag River and then annexed the Sultanate of Sulu in 1913 after the Battle of Bud Bagsak.

Aftermath

In the United States
Victory in the Spanish–American War turned the United States into a world power because the attainment of the territories of Guam, Puerto Rico, and the Philippines expanded its economic dominance in the Pacific. Its growth continued to have effects on U.S. foreign and economic policy well into the next century. Furthermore, McKinley's significant role in advancing the ratification of the treaty transformed the presidential office from a weaker position to a prototype of the stronger presidency that is more seen today.

In the new territories
The U.S. military occupation also continued to have further impacts abroad. In the Philippines, revolts against U.S. involvement, initiated on February 4, 1899, quickly surpassed the fighting that had just ended against the Spanish. As one Filipino writer noted in 1899:

Now here is a unique spectacle – the Filipinos fighting for liberty, the American people fighting to give them liberty.

According to the U.S. National Park Service, "The Spanish–American War and its aftermath delayed Philippine independence until after World War II, but established a relationship that fostered a substantial Filipino population within U.S. borders."

In Cuba, the Platt Amendment allowed the United States to continue its occupation without annexing it despite promises that had been made during the war and negotiations over Cuban freedom. To maintain control, the U.S. government espoused the idea that the Cuban people were unprepared for self-governance. As Senator Stephen Elkins noted:

When Cuba shall become a part of the American Union and the isthmian canal shall be completed, which is now assured, Puerto Rico, Cuba, Hawaii and the Philippines will be outposts of the great Republic, standing guard over American interests in the track of the world's commerce in its triumphant march around the globe. Our people will soon see and feel that these island possessions belonging to the United States are natural and logical, and in the great part we are to play in the affairs of the world we would not only give them up but wonder how the working of our natural destiny we could get on without them. The splendid chain of island possessions, reaching half-way around the world, would not be complete without Cuba, the gem of the Antilles.

In Spain: Generation of '98

The Generation of '98 comprised those Spanish writers deeply impacted by the events and committed to cultural and aesthetic renewal. They were associated with modernism. The term refers to the moral, political and social crisis in Spain produced by the humiliating loss of the worldwide empire. The intellectuals are known for their criticism of the Spanish literary and educational establishments, which they saw as steeped in conformism, ignorance, and a lack of any true spirit. Their criticism was coupled with and heavily connected to the group's dislike for the Restoration Movement that was occurring in Spanish government.

See also

 Treaty of Washington (1900) to remove any ground of misunderstanding growing out of the interpretation of Article III of the 1898 Treaty of Paris by clarifying specifics of territories relinquished to the United States by Spain. 
 Spanish–American War
 Philippine–American War
 Puerto Rico campaign
 German–Spanish Treaty (1899)
 Kiram–Bates Treaty
 Island of Palmas case

References

Further reading
 Grenville, John A. S. and George Berkeley Young. Politics, Strategy, and American Diplomacy: Studies in Foreign Policy, 1873–1917 (1966) pp 267–296, on "The influence of strategy upon history: the acquisition of the Philippines"

External links

 Law.yale.edu: Treaty of Peace Between the United States and Spain
 Msc.edu.ph: 1898 Treaty of Paris – full text of the Treaty of Paris ending the Spanish–American War.
 Library of Congress Guide to the Spanish–American War
 PBS: Crucible of Empire: The Spanish–American War Senate Debate over Ratification of the Treaty of Paris

Spanish–American War
1898 in Cuba
1898 in the Philippines
Paris (1898)
Paris (1898)
Spain–United States relations
Paris
Paris
Paris
Paris
Paris
1898 in Spain
1898 in the United States
1890s in Paris
Banana Wars
1898 treaties
December 1898 events